Tulnici is a commune in Vrancea County, Romania, located in the northwestern part of the county. It is one of the largest administrative areas in Vrancea County, situated at an altitude of 480 m above sea level at the foothills of the Vrancea Mountains. The commune is composed of four villages: Coza, Greșu, Lepșa and Tulnici, extending over an area of 30,000 hectares. It also included two other villages until 2003, when these were split off to form Păulești Commune. Tulnici is attested around the year 1466.

See also
Gălăciuc

Notes

Communes in Vrancea County
Localities in Western Moldavia